FEU Diliman, formerly known as FEU FERN College, is an educational institution at Sampaguita Avenue, Mapayapa Village, Diliman, Quezon City, Philippines. Founded in 1994 to commemorate the birth centennial of Dr. Nicanor B. Reyes Sr., founder and first president of the Far Eastern University (FEU), the institution offers programs from Kindergarten, Basic Education, High School, up to Tertiary Education. 

FEU Diliman is the home of the FEU Baby Tamaraws, the high school varsity team of FEU, for the Juniors Division of the University Athletic Association of the Philippines (UAAP). 

Like its sister schools, FEU Tech and FEU Alabang, the college runs on a trimester academic system. An academic year starts in the second week of August and ends every June.

History 
The campus it presently occupies was originally constructed for the Institute of Technology in the 1980s. After a few years of operations, the Institute returned to the campus in Manila.

In 1994, the Far Eastern University celebrated the birth centennial of its founder, Dr. Nicanor B. Reyes Sr., by establishing the FEU Nicanor Reyes Educational Foundation College (stylized as FEU FERN to be distinguished from the medical foundation, FEU-NRMF). The institution then offered baccalaureate courses in Accountancy, Business, and Information Technology.

In March 2018, the school's operations management was turned over from the Nicanor Reyes Educational Foundation to East Asia Computer Center, Inc. (EACCI), the corporation managing the FEU Institute of Technology (FEU Tech).
The shift is particularly advantageous for the school's move to espouse the Business-IT Fusion concept.

Academics

Basic Education 

 Kinder
 Grade School
 Junior High School

Senior High School 

 Academic Track
 STEM (Science, Technology, Engineering and Mathematics)
 HUMSS (Humanities and Social Sciences)
 ABM (Accountancy, Business and Management)
 GAS (General Academic Strand)

College of Accounts and Business 

 Bachelor of Science in Accountancy
 Bachelor of Science Business Administration
 major in Financial Management and Business Analytics
 major in Operations and Service Management
 major in Marketing Management and Multimedia Technology

College of Computer Studies 
 Bachelor of Science in Information Technology 
 Specialization in Animation and Game Development
 Specialization in Web and Mobile Application

Campus 
FEU Diliman has the biggest campus among the FEU schools, having 10 hectares (100,000 m2) of land. Because of this, it became an ideal location for upholding FEU's athletic excellence. FEU offers varsity sports in basketball 5x5 & 3x3, volleyball and beach volleyball ,football & futsal, cheerleading, badminton, tennis, swimming, Taekwondo, table tennis and chess.

In 2017, a groundbreaking ceremony took place for a new Basic Education Department Building. Led by FEU chairman Aurelio Montinola III, the event was attended by members of the school's board of trustees, administrators, faculty members, and students. The added structure is a symbol of the school's renewed commitment to address the demands and challenges of 21st-century learning.

FEU Diliman Football Field
Situated within the campus is the FEU Diliman Football Field, the Home of the Tamaraw Football Champions. The World Cup-sized artificial turf football field is a primary venue for hosting UAAP Football competitions and Palarong Pambansa.

FEU Diliman Sports Center
Seeking to develop more homegrown talents, a sports complex was built with the goal of becoming one of the premier college sports programs in the country.

Adding onto the artificial football pitch is the FEU Diliman Sports Center, a 3-storey building housing a maple-wood basketball court, the same flooring used in FIBA World Cup courts in Spain. Officially inaugurated in 2014, the sports center was built to be the home of the FEU varsity teams. It houses the administrative and support services for varsity sports including the Athletics Office, Team Conference Room, Athletes’ Dorm, Shower and Locker Rooms, Therapy Room, Team Tambayan and a Trophy Room.

References

External links 

 FEU Diliman

Educational institutions established in 1994
Elementary schools in Metro Manila
Universities and colleges in Quezon City
University Athletic Association of the Philippines high schools
Far Eastern University
1994 establishments in the Philippines